Magnolia School District is a public elementary school district in Orange County, California, United States, headquartered in Anaheim. Magnolia School District provides students with an education intended to build a foundation to prepare them for college and careers in the 21st century. All students are provided with rigorous standards-based instruction, one-to-one technology in grades K through six, and specially designed music and arts programs. Seven of the nine Magnolia Elementary Schools received the California Gold Ribbon Schools Award and the Title I Academic Achieving Schools Award in 2016, and one school received the Exemplary Arts Education Program Award.  The district feeds into the Anaheim Union High School District.

Schools

It includes the following schools:

 Dr. Albert Schweitzer
 Dr. Jonas Salk (opened 1955)
 Dr. Peter Marshall
 Esther L. Walter
 Juliette Low School of the Arts
 Lord Baden-Powell (opened 1966)
 Mattie Lou Maxwell
 Robert M. Pyles STEM Academy (opened 1958)
 Walt Disney
 Ted Lange

References

External links
 
 
 

School districts in Orange County, California
Education in Anaheim, California
1895 establishments in California
School districts established in 1895